Wahid Abdallah El Fattal (born 1 June 1978) is a Lebanese football coach and former player who is currently the goalkeeper coach of the Lebanon national team.

As a player, El Fattal represented Lebanon in the 2000 AFC Asian Cup. He also played for Nejmeh, Ahli Saida, Sagesse, Ansar, Shabab Sahel, and Ahed.

Club career 
El Fattal began his youth career at Nejmeh on 5 September 1992.

Managerial career 
El Fattal was announced goalkeeper coach of the Lebanon national team in 2019, under the tenure of Liviu Ciobotariu.

Honours
Nejmeh
 Lebanese Premier League: 1999–2000, 2001–02, 2003–04, 2004–05

Individual
 Lebanese Premier League Team of the Season: 1998–99, 1999–2000

References

External links

 
 
 
 
 

1978 births
Living people
Footballers from Beirut
Lebanese footballers
Association football goalkeepers
Nejmeh SC players
Al Ahli Saida SC players
Sagesse SC footballers
Al Ansar FC players
Shabab Al Sahel FC players
Al Ahed FC players
Lebanese Premier League players
Lebanon international footballers
Asian Games competitors for Lebanon
Footballers at the 1998 Asian Games
2000 AFC Asian Cup players
Association football goalkeeping coaches